Raymond Gordon Clemons (April 2, 1921 – December 27, 2005) was an American football player and coach. He played professionally as a guard in the National Football League (NFL) with the Green Bay Packers in  1947.  Clemons served as the head football coach at California State University, Sacramento—known as Sacramento State College before 1972—from 1961 to 1975, compiling a record of 72–75–3.

Biography
Clemons was born on April 2, 1921 in Roseville, California.  He is the father of former Sacramento State football coach, Mike Clemons.

Playing career
Clemons played with the Green Bay Packers during the 1947 NFL season. He played at college football at Saint Mary's College of California.

Coaching career
Clemons was named head football coach at Sacramento City College in 1956. He moved on to Sacramento State College in 1960, serving as line coach for one season before succeeding Johnny Baker as head football coach.

Head coaching record

College

See also
 List of Green Bay Packers players

References

External links
 
 

1921 births
2005 deaths
American football guards
Green Bay Packers players
Sacramento State Hornets football coaches
Saint Mary's Gaels football players
Junior college football coaches in the United States
People from Fremont, California
Sportspeople from Roseville, California
Players of American football from California
Coaches of American football from California